The 2020 Metro Atlantic Athletic Conference women's basketball tournament was to be the postseason women's basketball tournament for the Metro Atlantic Athletic Conference for the 2019–20 NCAA Division I women's basketball season. It was to be held from March 10–14, 2020, at the Jim Whelan Boardwalk Hall in Atlantic City, New Jersey for the first time in MAAC history.  The defending champions were the Quinnipiac Bobcats.

On March 12, 2020, amidst the tournament's quarterfinals, both the NCAA and MAAC officials canceled the tournament, due to the coronavirus pandemic.

Seeds
All 11 teams in the conference participate in the tournament. The top five teams receive byes to the quarterfinals. Teams are seeded by record within the conference, with a tiebreaker system to seed teams with identical conference records.

Schedule

Bracket

* denotes number of overtimes

See also
 2020 MAAC men's basketball tournament

References

MAAC women's basketball tournament
Sports competitions in Atlantic City, New Jersey
2019–20 Metro Atlantic Athletic Conference women's basketball season
MAAC Women's Basketball
MAAC women's basketball tournament
Women's sports in New Jersey
College basketball tournaments in New Jersey